Thomas Bayne McDonald  (12 September 1907 – 26 March 1987) was a pioneering New Zealand winemaker. He was born at Greenmeadows, New Zealand, on 12 September 1907. In the 1974 New Year Honours, McDonald was appointed an Officer of the Order of the British Empire, for services to winemaking.

McDonald's name lives on through Montana Wines' flagship red wine Tom, and through the McDonald Cellar at the Church Road Winery.

References

1907 births
1987 deaths
20th-century New Zealand businesspeople
New Zealand winemakers
New Zealand Officers of the Order of the British Empire
People from Napier, New Zealand